NHL 2K6 is an ice hockey simulation made by 2K Sports, and published on the Xbox, PlayStation 2, and Xbox 360 consoles. It features goaltender Marty Turco on the cover of games sold in the United States, and forward Mats Sundin on the cover of games sold in Canada and Europe.

The game brings all the features from the previous year's game, ESPN NHL 2K5, along with others. It features a new "crease control" system, which allows the player to control the player's team's goalie and make critical saves. Also, it implements the new NHL shootout system as the default.

The game is also the first ice hockey simulation to be made for the Xbox 360. It was priced at USD $19.99 for the Xbox and PlayStation 2 and $59.99 for the Xbox 360.


Reception

The game received "favorable" reviews on all platforms according to the review aggregation website Metacritic.

See also
NHL 2K

References

External links
 
Official Website

2K Sports games
06
Ice hockey video games
Xbox games
Xbox 360 games
PlayStation 2 games
2005 video games
Video games developed in the United States
Video games set in 2005
Video games set in 2006
Take-Two Interactive games